is a former Japanese football player and manager. His sons Atsuki Wada and Tomoki Wada are also footballer.

Playing career
Wada was born in Kobe on January 21, 1965. After graduating from Juntendo University, he joined Matsushita Electric (later Gamba Osaka) in 1987. He played as regular player as left side back and left midfielder from first season. In 1990, the club won the champions 1990 Emperor's Cup first major title in club history. However his opportunity to play decreased from 1994. In July 1995, he moved to his local club Vissel Kobe in Japan Football League. He played as regular player and the club was promoted to J1 League in 1997. However he could hardly play in the match from 1997 and he retired end of 1998 season.

Coaching career

Vissel Kobe
After the retirement from football, Wada remained as the coaching staff of Vissel Kobe. In 2009, he was appointed as the senior team caretaker after the resignation of Caio Júnior. Wada managed the team for five games in J1 and stepped down from the head coach position after the appointment of Toshiya Miura. He still worked as the assistant coach for the club.

On 12 September 2010, after the dismissal of Miura, Wada was promoted to be the club head coach again. In the later season, Masahiro Wada led Vissel Kobe to finish in the ninth position on J1 League, the highest rank in the club history.  However, Wada was sacked by the club in 2012 season after 8 games with 3 wins and 5 losses in J1 since the club had aimed for the top four position for the continental football.

He still worked as the executive staff for Vissel Kobe until November 2013.

Chonburi
In 2014, Masahiro Wada has become the first foreign head coach of Chonburi  in Thai Premier League, followed the invitation of Wittaya Laohakul who was the director of Chonburi and his teammate at Matsushita Electric. Wada finished his season in Thailand with the second place of 2014 Thai Premier League, runner-up of 2014 Thai FA Cup and received the TPL Coach of the Year award. However, he decided to turn down the new contract from Chonburi and return to Japan.

Return to Japan
In December 2014, Mashiro Wada has returned to Japan and become the manager of Kyoto Sanga FC in J2 League. He later stepped down from his position on 10 July 2015 after dropping the club to the relegation zone.

Second spell on Thailand
On 22 October 2015, Port F.C. made the official appointment of Masahiro Wada for the last nine games of relegation avoiding in Thai Premier League. Wada made the impressive run with Port but could not save them from relegation. He has maintained his role as the club head coach down in Division 1. Wada was sacked by Port F.C. on 11 July 2016 when the club was in third place and has 5 points away from leading position after 19 games. He was replaced by Jadet Meelarp.

Club statistics

Managerial statistic

A win or loss by the penalty shoot-out is counted as the draw in time.

References

External links
 
 
 

1965 births
Living people
Juntendo University alumni
Association football people from Hyōgo Prefecture
Japanese footballers
Japan Soccer League players
J1 League players
Japan Football League (1992–1998) players
Gamba Osaka players
Vissel Kobe players
Japanese football managers
J1 League managers
J2 League managers
Vissel Kobe managers
Kyoto Sanga FC managers
Association football defenders